Robert Zimmerman may refer to:

 Robert Allen Zimmerman, birth name of Bob Dylan (born 1941), American singer-songwriter
 Robert C. Zimmerman (1910–1996), Wisconsin Secretary of State
 Robert D. Zimmerman (born 1952), author
 Robert Zimmerman (swimmer) (1881–1980), Canadian swimmer
 Robert Zimmerman, brother of George Zimmerman
 Robert Zimmerman, Democratic nominee in the 2022 New York 3rd congressional district election

See also
 Robert Zimmermann (disambiguation)